Our Lady of La Vang refers to a reported Marian apparition at a time when Catholics were persecuted and killed in Vietnam. The Shrine of our Lady of La Vang (Basilica of Our Lady of La Vang) is situated in what is today Hai Phu commune in Hải Lăng District of Quảng Trị Province in Central Vietnam.

History 
Fearing the spread of Catholicism, the Cảnh Thịnh Emperor restricted the practice of Catholicism in the country in 1798. Soon thereafter, the emperor issued an anti-Catholic edict and persecution ensued.

Many people sought refuge in the rainforest of La Vang in Quảng Trị Province, Vietnam, and many became very ill. While hiding in the jungle, the community gathered every night at the foot of a tree to pray the rosary. One night, an apparition surprised them. In the branches of the tree a lady appeared, wearing the traditional Vietnamese áo dài dress and holding a child in her arms, with two angels beside her. The people present interpreted the vision as the Virgin Mary and the infant Jesus Christ. They said that Our Lady comforted them and told them to boil leaves from the trees for medicine to cure the illness. Legend states that the term "La Vang" was a derivative of the Vietnamese word meaning "crying out". Another hypothesis is that La Vang is distorted from the toponym Lá Vằng, lá meaning leaf and vằng meaning jasminum subtriplinerve, a tree species whose leaves are used to made a tisane; according to an ancient practice, a location was sometimes named after a prominent local species of plant or animal.<ref>[https://lavang.com.vn/cay-la-vang-va-su-tic-duc-me-hien-linh-1798/ Holy Church La Vang: Jasminum subtriplinerve and the Tale of the Apparition of Our Lady at La Vang in 1798] (in Vietnamese)</ref>

In 1802 the Catholics returned to their villages, passing on the story of the apparition in La Vang and its message. As the story of the apparition spread, many came to pray at this site and to offer incense. In 1820, a chapel was built.

From 1830 to 1885 another wave of persecutions decimated the Catholic population, during the height of which the chapel in honour of Our Lady of La Vang was destroyed. In 1886, construction on a new chapel began. Following its completion, Bishop Gaspar (Loc) consecrated the chapel in honour of Our Lady Help of Christians, in 1901.

On December 8, 1954, the statue of Our Lady of La Vang was brought from Tri Bun back to the holy shrine. The Vietnamese Bishops Conference chose the church of Our Lady of La Vang as the National Shrine in honour of the Immaculate Conception. La Vang became the National Marian Center of Vietnam on April 13, 1961. Pope John XXIII elevated the Church of Our Lady of La Vang to the rank of a minor basilica on August 22, 1961. It was destroyed again during the Vietnam War in 1972.

Though there is no official Vatican recognition of this event as a Marian apparition, on June 19, 1998, Pope John Paul II publicly recognized the importance of Our Lady of La Vang and expressed desire to rebuild the La Vang Basilica in commemoration of the 200th anniversary of the first vision. In 2012, the New Basilica was officially built with the endorsement from the Vietnamese government.

In the Philippines, the Our Lady of La Vang Church at Viet Ville, Barangay Santa Lourdes in Puerto Princesa City in Palawan. Our Lady of La Vang has become a patroness of Puerto Princesa and patroness of Palawan. She was known as Inang Lala'' (Mother Lala).

In May 2022, Archbishop Joseph Nguyễn Chí Linh announced the dedication and consecration of the new basilica to be during the La Vang congress in 2023, that will happen from 14 to 15 August.

Churches outside Vietnam

Australia
 Our Lady of La Vang Shrine - Melbourne, Victoria

Canada
 Our Lady of La Vang Parish - Ottawa, Ontario website: http://www.lavangparish.org/

Philippines
 Our Lady of La Vang Church, Viet-Ville, Puerto Princesa City, Palawan

United States
 Our Lady of La Vang Community (Church of the Visitacion) - San Francisco, California website: https://visitacionchurch.org/
 Our Lady of La Vang Parish - San Jose, California website: http://ducmelavangparish.org/
 Our Lady of La Vang Parish - Tucson, Arizona; website: http://www.lavangtucson.com/
 Our Lady of La Vang Parish - Houston, Texas website: http://lavangchurch.org/
 Our Lady of La Vang Shrine (Christ Cathedral) - Garden Grove, California website: https://www.rcbo.org/community-story/lady-of-la-vang-shrine/
 Vietnamese Catholic Center Diocese of Orange (Hội La Vang) - Santa Ana, California website: https://www.hoiducmelavang.org/
 Our Lady of La Vang Church - Santa Ana, California website: http://ourladyoflavang.org/
 Our Lady of La Vang Church - Cincinnati, Ohio
 Our Lady of La Vang Parish - Happy Valley, Oregon website: http://gxlavangoregon.com/
 Our Lady of La Vang Shrine - New Orleans, Louisiana website: http://lavangshrine.net/
 Our Lady of Vietnam Catholic Church - Silver Spring, Maryland website: https://www.olvn-dc.org/index.html
 Shrine of Our Lady of La Vang - Las Vegas, Nevada (also serves as the Vietnamese Catholic Center in Las Vegas) website: http://lavanglasvegas.com/
 Shrine of Our Lady of La Vang Basilica of the National Shrine of the Immaculate Conception - Washington, D.C. website: https://www.nationalshrine.org/blog/remembering-the-martyrs-of-vietnam/
 Shrine of Our Lady of La Vang (National Shrine Grotto of Lourdes) - Emmitsburg, Maryland website: https://www.nsgrotto.org/plan-your-visit.html
 Our Lady of La Vang Catholic Church - Baltimore, Maryland website: http://olol-baltimore.net/
 Our Lady of La Vang Vietnamese Mission (Giáo Xứ Đức Mẹ La Vang Miami) - Hallandale Beach, Florida website: http://ducmelavangmiami.com/
 Our Lady of La Vang Church - Albuquerque, New Mexico website: http://lavangnm.org/
 Our Lady Of Vietnam Church - Atlanta, Georgia website: http://giaoxuducmevietnam.org/
 Our Lady of La Vang Church - Wyoming, Michigan
 Our Lady of La Vang Church - Bridgeport, Connecticut
 Our Lady of La Vang Church - Norfolk, Virginia website: http://gxdmlvvn.net/
 Our Lady of La Vang Parish - Raleigh, North Carolina website: http://www.ducmelavangraleigh.org/
 Our Lady of La Vang Catholic Church - Greer, South Carolina website: https://www.lavangsc.org/

See also
 Marian Days
 Our Lady of Trà Kiệu

References

External links

 
 
 

La Vang
La Vang
History of Catholicism in Vietnam
Vietnamese Roman Catholic saints
Religion in Vietnam
La Vang